Laila Ellen Kaarina Hirvisaari (7 June 1938 – 16 June 2021), also known as Laila Hietamies, was a Finnish author and writer. By 2008, more than four million copies of her works had been sold.

Biography
When Laila Hirvisaari was three years old, her father Aarne died in the Continuation War between Finland and the Soviet Union, so she had no memories of him. After the war, she and her family were evacuated first to Lappeenranta and later to the western part of Finland.

In 1958, she married Heikki Hietamies, who later also became a well-known Finnish author. He is also known for presenting the Tangomarkkinat ("Tango fair"), a major tango competition (1985–1999). 

Laila Hietamies's first novel Lehmusten kaupunki ("City of the Lindens") was published in 1972 and began a series of novels about Lappeenranta;  the seventh part was published in 2004. Hietamies wrote many other novel series, mostly about Karelia and the consequences of the wars of Finland in the 1940s. She wrote also books about a Russian princess, Sonja, during the Russian Revolution.

On 9 December 2004, Laila Hietamies, along with her three cousins, changed their name back to the maiden name Hirvisaari and from then on, her books were published under that name.

Hirvisaari received many respected Finnish literature awards but never the most prestigious one, the Finlandia Prize. Her novel about Catherine the Great] (Minä, Katariina), however, was nominated for the Finlandia in 2011.

Hirvisaari wrote 34 novels and many short stories and plays. A movie was based on her novel Hylätyt talot, autiot pihat ("Abandoned houses, empty yards") in 2000. Several of her books have been translated into other languages:

Myrskypilvet (Tormipilved), Estonian, Eesti Raamat, 1996
Satakielimetsä (Ööbikusalu), Estonian, Eesti Raamat, 1998
Sonja (Vürstitar Sonja), Estonian, Eesti Raamat, 1995, translated by Debora Vaarandi
Valkoakaasiat (Valged akaatsiad), Eesti Raamat, 1996, translated by Debora Vaarandi
Vienan punainen kuu (Red Moon over White Sea), English, Aspasia Books/Canada, 2000, translated by Börje Vähämäki
Viktoria (Victoria), Estonian, Eesti Raamat, 1999, translated by Anne Karu

References

External links
 

1938 births
2021 deaths
Writers from Vyborg
20th-century Finnish novelists
Finnish women novelists
21st-century Finnish novelists
21st-century Finnish women writers
20th-century Finnish women writers